SmarTeach UGMed – a product of MedRC is a digital version of the undergraduate medicine classroom where students pursuing medicine can see and hear lectures delivered by expert subject teachers from all over the country. These lectures have a large amount of relevant multimedia components like 2D and 3D animations, text slides, still images and panoramas, audio and videos.

This product is currently catering to the MBBS and BDS curriculum. The curriculum is based on MBBS curriculum as prescribed by Medical Council of India MCI. The entire curriculum has been broken into component subjects, chapters and topics. Each topic constitutes a module of learning consisting of several granular learning objects such as video lectures, slides, animations of concepts, textual notes, glossaries, questions relevant to the topic, book and journal references, etc. The approach to development, quality practices adopted during development and content presented in product have been inspected and approved by MCI.

References

External links
 

Medical education